Márcio Rodrigues Araújo (born 11 June 1984) is a Brazilian footballer who plays as a defensive midfielder for Sampaio Corrêa. He previously played for big Brazilian clubs such as Flamengo, Palmeiras and Atlético Mineiro.

Career

Flamengo
On 20 February 2014 Araujo completed his transfer to Flamengo. On 13 April 2014 he scored his first goal for his new club surrounded with much controversy, it was the title winning goal for the 2014 Rio State League on the injury time against Vasco da Gama, although he was clearly offside, and the referee bad call has been very criticised by Vasco da Gama.

On 4 May 2014 Araujo scored his first Série A goal in a match against his former club Palmeiras, Flamengo won 4–2.

On 28 December 2016 Araújo extended his contract with Flamengo for another year until December 2017.

Career statistics

Honours
Atlético Mineiro
Campeonato Brasileiro Série B: 2006
Campeonato Mineiro: 2007

Palmeiras
Copa do Brasil: 2012
Campeonato Brasileiro Série B: 2013

Flamengo
Campeonato Carioca: 2014, 2017

References

External links

galodigital 
websoccerclub 

1984 births
Living people
Brazilian footballers
Brazilian expatriate footballers
Campeonato Brasileiro Série A players
Campeonato Brasileiro Série B players
J1 League players
Association football midfielders
Sport Club Corinthians Alagoano players
Clube Atlético Mineiro players
Guarani FC players
Kashiwa Reysol players
Sociedade Esportiva Palmeiras players
CR Flamengo footballers
Associação Chapecoense de Futebol players
Sport Club do Recife players
Sampaio Corrêa Futebol Clube players
Brazilian expatriate sportspeople in Japan
Expatriate footballers in Japan